= Alpine skiing at the 2007 Canada Games =

Alpine skiiing at the 2007 Canada Games consisted of Super-G, Giant Slalom, Slalom, and Ski Cross events. Freestyle events were held at Dan's Descent on the Mount Sima ski hill in Whitehorse on the second week of the games.

== Events ==
=== Super-G ===
Medal	Men's	Time	Women's	Time
Gold	(Alberta) Cam George Brewington	0:49.70	(Alberta) Andrea Louise Bliss	0:51.42
Silver	(Alberta) Chris Robert Scheele	0:49.89	(Ontario) Krystyn Catherine Peterson	0:51.55
Bronze	(Ontario) Cameron Wickham	0:50.39	(Quebec) Catherine Morel	0:51.91

=== Giant Slalom ===
Medal	Men's	Time	Women's	Time
Gold	(Ontario) Christopher Nicholas Barber	2:02.18	(British Columbia) Kelsey Danielle Serwa	2:07.17
Silver	(Alberta) Cam George Brewington	2:02.65	(Alberta) Andrea Louise Bliss	2:07.40
Bronze	(Quebec) Simon Mannella	2:03.78	(Ontario) Krystyn Catherine Peterson	2:08.27

=== Slalom ===
Medal	Men's	Time	Women's	Time
Gold	(Ontario) Christopher Nicholas Barber	1:37.93	(Ontario) Krystyn Catherine Peterson	1:46.35
Silver	(Alberta) Chris Robert Scheele	1:38.96	(Quebec) Ève Routhier	1:47.35
Bronze	(Quebec) Mathieu Routhier	1:39.26	(Ontario) Kelly Leigh Singer	1:47.77
